Michael Horner (born 27 March 1938) is a Kenyan former sports shooter. He competed in the 50 metre pistol event at the 1964 Summer Olympics.

References

External links
 

1928 births
Possibly living people
Kenyan male sport shooters
Olympic shooters of Kenya
Shooters at the 1964 Summer Olympics
Place of birth missing
20th-century Kenyan people